Sidney Edgerton (August 17, 1818 – July 19, 1900) was an American politician, lawyer, judge and teacher from Ohio. He served during the American Civil War, as a Squirrel Hunter. During this time, Edgerton served as a U.S. Congressman. In 1863, Abraham Lincoln appointed him the first Chief justice of the Idaho Territorial Court. Edgerton lobbied for the creation of separate territories, out of the Idaho Territory, and in 1864, Abraham Lincoln appointed Edgerton as the first Territorial Governor of Montana. During his term as Territorial Governor, he was an alleged member of the infamous Montana Vigilantes, and was reputedly among its founders.

He was a sickly child that was not expected to survive; burial clothing was ordered for him. He survived and, eventually, moved to Ohio. He became a lawyer, and was involved in both the Free Soil Party and the Republican Party. After John Brown's raid on Harpers Ferry, Edgerton was invited, by Brown's family, to settle Brown's affairs. He never was able to meet with Brown. He had a successful career as a politician, and after his term ended in the Territory of Montana, Edgerton returned to Ohio. He served as a lawyer in his home state until his death in 1900.

Early life
Edgerton was born in Cazenovia, New York, on August 17, 1818. His parents were Amos and Zerviah (Graham) Edgerton, both of Connecticut. Zerviah was a cousin of millionaire philanthropist Anson Greene Phelps. As a child, Edgerton was so sickly and frail that burial clothes were prepared for him. Whereas the young Edgerton avoided death, the same could not be said for his father, a teacher by trade who had been blind for years. Amos Edgerton died when Sidney was still an infant. Left with six children to raise, Zerviah Edgerton struggled to maintain her family. By age eight, young Sidney was out of the home and working himself through school. He eventually attended the Genesee Wesleyan Seminary in Lima, New York, where his cousin taught, and where he would later become an instructor as well.

Early career
In 1844, he moved to Ohio and began working in the law office of Rufus P. Spalding. Edgerton also taught in an academy in Tallmadge, Ohio, the same year. He studied law and graduated from the Cincinnati Law School in 1845. The next year Edgerton was admitted to the bar and began the practice of law in Akron, Ohio. During this time, Edgerton declared himself an Agnostic. He married Mary Wright (1827–1885) of Tallmadge on May 18, 1848, but Mary almost ended the relationship, because of Edgerton's religious views.

Political career
Edgerton was a delegate to the convention that formed the Free Soil Party, in 1848. He then served as prosecuting attorney of Summit County, Ohio, from 1852 to 1856. Later in 1856, Edgerton was a delegate to the first Republican National Convention. That same year, he was nominated for probate judge, but he declined the nomination. Edgerton was elected as a Republican to the United States House of Representatives in 1858.

House of Representatives and John Brown

Edgerton began his House term in 1859. As an abolitionist, he was at risk of attack; when his term began, he purchased a sword for his defense. The sword was held, secretly, inside a walking cane. As an ardent anti-slavery member of the House of Representatives, Edgerton made numerous speeches about its abolition. After John Brown's raid on Harpers Ferry, Edgerton was asked by Brown's family to come and settle his affairs. This was very dangerous, as Edgerton was anti-slavery. Edgerton went by train, and was joined by Congressman Alexander Boteler and Congressman H. G. Blake. While on the Baltimore & Ohio Railroad, Boteler was told that the men did not need to go on. Boteler and Blake listened to the advice, but Edgerton refused to go back.

On his arrival at Charles Town, Edgerton found the commander of Harper's Ferry, General William Taliaferro. Edgerton told Taliaferro about his request, but Taliaferro informed him that Governor Wise would only allow family and a minister to visit John Brown. That night, Taliaferro arranged for a wagon to take him back to Washington, D.C. Edgerton was given a driver and a guard, for his journey. During his ride back, a group of men on horses rode up, and Edgerton's guard jumped out of the wagon and ran. The men on horses retrieved the man, and brought him back to the wagon. Edgerton asked his guard why he ran, and the guard replied, "I heard them say that they would kill [you]". The men on horses then attempted to get Edgerton to leave the wagon, but he refused. He eventually made it out of Virginia, but always believed had he left the wagon, the men would have killed him. After this encounter, Edgerton viewed Southerners, generally, with contempt. Edgerton continued to be a large voice in the anti-slavery movement, but decided not to run for reelection in 1862.

American Civil War
During the Civil War, Edgerton served briefly as colonel in the Ohio Militia. Edgerton was one of the Squirrel Hunters, expert shots from Ohio, and served at the Defense of Cincinnati. Edgerton served as both a U.S. Congressman and soldier at the same time, during the first few years of the war.

Territory of Idaho
In 1863, Edgerton was appointed, by President Abraham Lincoln, to be the Chief Justice of the Territory of Idaho. His salary was to be $2,500 a year (about $34,000 in 2009). He left with his wife, his children, his niece, Lucia Darling, his nephew, Wilbur F. Sanders, Sanders' wife, Sanders' children, a family friend, Henry Tilden, and a young woman named Almarette Greer. Edgerton's group first travelled to Cleveland, Ohio, by train, they then traveled, by boat, across Lake Erie, continuing, by train, to St. Joseph, Missouri, they then travelled, by steamboat, to Omaha, Nebraska. They then bought their provisions, and began their trip on ox-drawn wagons. The party was met by good weather, and no bad confrontations with Native Americans. The group stopped at Chimney Rock, to visit. They then started off again, on their trip. One incident that did happen was when Edgerton fell from one of the wagons, and was almost crushed by one of the wheels. The group arrived at South Pass, in August 1863. After arriving in South Pass City, Edgerton received a telegraph message saying that the capital of the Territory of Idaho had yet to be decided. On August 15, as the group was heading west, a man arrived with a telegraph message saying that the capital of the Territory of Idaho was to be at Lewiston. The message was welcome news to the group, but knew that to get to Lewiston, before the snows, would be difficult. As the group descended the western slopes of the Rocky Mountains, it was discovered that Mary Edgerton was pregnant. In September, the group arrived at the trail, beginning at the Blackfoot River. Edgerton realized, that it would not be possible to make it to Lewiston, before the snows. The group then changed its course for Bannack. The party crossed the Snake River, by ferry, on September 6. After crossing, they met Sheriff Henry Plummer. This would not be the last meeting between Edgerton and Plummer. The group continued, and crossed Monida Pass. The group finally made it to Bannack, on September 16.

After arriving in Bannack, Idaho Territory, Edgerton reported to Territorial Governor William Wallace. Edgerton requested the designation of courts and districts, but no court was designated for his district. Wallace appointed Edgerton to one of the farthest and most remote places away from the capitol. When he arrived there was no administrator to administer the oath of office. He never took the oath of office and therefore he never legally took his position as Chief Justice. The Edgerton's then bought a home at a Sheriff's sale for $400. The one room home became the first Montana Governor's Residence. After arriving in his district, he began taking tours of the territory gold fields and gold camps. Edgerton realized the value of the gold fields, to the Union. He was then chosen, by the local population, to go to Washington D.C. His mission was to lobby for the split of the Territory of Idaho. Edgerton and Sanders then left in a stagecoach for Washington. Edgerton arrived with $2,500 in gold nuggets in his pockets (about $34,000 in 2009). He presented this to President Abraham Lincoln and numerous members of Congress. His lobbying paid off in 1864. That year the Territory of Idaho split into three parts. The three parts included the Territory of Idaho, the Territory of Montana, and the Territory of Dakota.

Territory of Montana
Before leaving Washington, D.C. for the Territory of Idaho, Edgerton had a private meeting with President Abraham Lincoln, in which he asked for the position of Territorial Governor of Montana. Lincoln told Edgerton that he would think about it. Edgerton then left for the west, unsure of whether or not he would have a new position when he arrived, but on May 23, 1864, while on his way home, Mary Edgerton had a baby girl. She named her Idaho, unknowing of the fact that it was now the Territory of Montana. After seeing his skills in the Territory of Idaho, President Abraham Lincoln appointed Edgerton as the first Territorial Governor of Montana.

Lincoln appointed Edgerton on June 22, 1864, and Edgerton found out on his arrival at Bannack. Bannack was created the capital of Montana Territory, and the Edgertons were able to keep their same home. Edgerton was not supported by many settlers and miners in the Territory, as the majority were from border states and either supported the Confederacy or were Democrats who abhorred radical Republicans like him. There were even death threats for those who flew an American Flag. Edgerton put together a quick census, so that an election could be held. The elections would be for the State Council, State House, and for the Delegate of the Territory of Montana to the House of Representatives. After the elections of 1865, Democrats took power in the House, and took the Delegate seat in the House of Representatives. While the Republicans took the Council. Numerous engagements between the Governor and Democrats occurred, causing troubles for the Montana Legislature. In all, though, the legislature worked with Edgerton to pass numerous bills on roads, public education, irrigation, and mining.

In 1865, Edgerton began to have to deal with threats from Native Americans. General Patrick Connor was sent to handle these threats. He led an expedition against the Sioux and Cheyenne Indians, who were disrupting travelers along the Bozeman Trail. Edgerton then issued a proclamation for five hundred volunteers to help defend immigrants. Numerous other battles were fought, and numerous treaties were signed between the Government of the Territory of Montana and the Native Americans.

In 1865, Edgerton was forced to go East to secure funds for the territory. The revenues being received were not enough to pay for expenses, and Edgerton himself gave large sums of his own money to the territory. He hoped to both get funds for the state, and receive compensation for his expenditures. He would receive neither. Edgerton left the Territory, in September 1865. During this time, Edgerton was in Washington, D.C. While he was away, Thomas Francis Meagher served as the acting Territorial Governor of Montana. Despite remaining governor, until January 13, 1866, Edgerton did not return to Montana for 25 years. To express their dislike for Edgerton, the state legislature changed the name of Edgerton County to Lewis and Clark County.

Montana Vigilantes
After numerous acts of lawlessness, and with no established court system, Edgerton supported his nephew, Wilbur F. Sanders, and other residents of Bannack and Virginia City as they organized the Vigilantes. This group began meeting in secret, and began trying and lynching suspected criminals. On January 10, 1864, members of the Vigilance Committee traveled to Sheriff Henry Plummer's home. Plummer was suspected of murder, and the men coaxed him from his sickbed. They then grabbed him, and brought him to a gallows he had constructed for hangings. Then the men put a noose over his neck, and hanged him next to two of his deputies who were also accused of being road agents. Along with the lynching of Plummer, the Montana Vigilantes hanged 22 road agents. After these actions Edgerton's nephew, Wilbur F. Sanders, was forced to defend the group in Utah courts.

Death
After returning to Akron, Ohio, with his family in the Fall of 1865, Edgerton went back to his law practice. He was involved in his law practice until his death on July 19, 1900. He is buried in Tallmadge Cemetery in Tallmadge, Ohio.

Notes

Citations

References

 Allen, Frederick;  A decent, orderly lynching: the Montana vigilantes, University of Oklahoma Press, 2004, 
 Bancroft, Hubert Howe, Victor, Frances Fuller; History of Washington, Idaho, and Montana: 1845–1889, History Co., 1890
 Chiorazzi, Michael, Most, Marguerite; Prestatehood Legal Materials: A Fifty-State Research Guide, Including New York City and the District of Columbia, Volumes 1 & 2, Routledge, 2006, 
 Dimsdale, Thomas Josiah, Noyes, Alva Josiah; The vigilantes of Montana: or, Popular justice in the Rocky mountains; being a correct and impartial narrative of the chase, trial, capture, and execution of Henry Plummer's road agent band, together with accounts of the lives and crimes of many of the robbers and desperadoes, the whole being ..., State publishing co., 1915
 Eicher, John H., Eicher David J.; Civil War high commands, Stanford University Press, 2001, 
 Gaitis, James M.; A Stout Cord and a Good Drop: A Novel of the Founding of Montana, Globe Pequot, 2006, 
 Goodman, Rebecca, Brunsman, Barrett J.; This Day in Ohio History, Emmis Books, 2004, 
 Goodspeed, Weston Arthur; Volume 6 of The Province and the States: A History of the Province of Louisiana Under France and Spain, and of the Territories and States of the United States Formed Therefrom, The Weston historical association, 1904
 Holmes, Krys, Walter, Dave, Dailey, Susan C.; Montana: Stories of the Land, Montana Historical Society, 2008, 
 Idaho Supreme Court, Cummins, John; Cases argued and adjudged in the Supreme Court of the territory of Idaho: January term, 1866, and January and August terms, 1867, Statesman Pub. Co., 1867
 Inflation Calculator 2009
 Knight, William Henry; Bancroft's hand-book almanac for the Pacific States, H.H. Bancroft and Company, 1864
 Lane, Samuel Alanson; Fifty years and over of Akron and Summit County: embellished by nearly six hundred engravings—portraits of pioneer settlers, prominent citizens, business, official and professional—ancient and modern views, etc.; nine-tenth's of a century of solid local history—pioneer incidents, interesting ..., Beacon Job Department, 1892
 Malone, Michael P., Roeder, Richard B., Lang, William L.; Montana: a history of two centuries, University of Washington Press, 1991, 
 McPherson, Robert; Bannack Montana, Lulu.com, 2006, 
 Merrill-Maker, Andrea; Montana Almanac, Globe Pequot, 2005, 
 Morgan, Ted;  Shovel of Stars: The Making of the American West – 1800 to the Present, Simon & Schuster, 1996, 
 
 
 Slatta, Richard W.; The mythical West: an encyclopedia of legend, lore, and popular culture, ABC-CLIO, 2001, 
 Smith, Joseph Patterson; History of the Republican party in Ohio, Volume 1, Lewis Publishing Company, 1898
 Taylor, William Alexander; Ohio in Congress from 1803 to 1901, with notes and sketches of senators and representatives, and other historical data and incidents, XX. Century Publishing Co., 1900
 
 The Encyclopedia Americana: a library of universal knowledge, Volume 19, Encyclopedia Americana Corp., 1919
 The National cyclopaedia of American biography: being the history of the United States as illustrated in the lives of the founders, builders, and defenders of the republic, and of the men and women who are doing the work and moulding the thought of the present time, Volume 11, J. T. White company, 1901
 Thompson, Francis M., Owens, Kenneth N.; A Tenderfoot in Montana: Reminiscences of the Gold Rush, the Vigilantes, and the Birth of Montana Territory, Montana Historical Society, 2004, 
 Upton, Harriet Taylor, Cutler, Harry Gardner; History of the Western Reserve, Volume 1, The Lewis publishing company, 1910
 Waldrep, Christopher; The many faces of Judge Lynch: extralegal violence and punishment in America, Palgrave Macmillan, 2002, 
 Works: History of Washington, Idaho, and Montana. 1890, History Co., 1890

External links
 Retrieved on 2008-02-14

Republican Party members of the United States House of Representatives from Ohio
Governors of Montana Territory
Idaho Territory judges
Ohio lawyers
County district attorneys in Ohio
People from Cazenovia, New York
People from Livingston County, New York
Politicians from Akron, Ohio
People of Ohio in the American Civil War
People of Montana in the American Civil War
1818 births
1900 deaths
American agnostics
University of Cincinnati College of Law alumni
Ohio Free Soilers
Montana pioneers
Montana Republicans
Idaho Republicans
19th-century American politicians
People from Tallmadge, Ohio
19th-century American judges
19th-century American lawyers